Stefan Rosenbauer (24 March 1896 – 18 August 1967) was a German fencer and photographer. He won a bronze medal in the team foil event at the 1936 Summer Olympics.

References

External links
 

1896 births
1967 deaths
People from Biberach an der Riss
Sportspeople from Tübingen (region)
People from the Kingdom of Württemberg
German male fencers
Olympic fencers of Germany
Fencers at the 1936 Summer Olympics
Olympic bronze medalists for Germany
Olympic medalists in fencing
Medalists at the 1936 Summer Olympics